The Journal of Hydrometeorology is a scientific journal published by the American Meteorological Society. It covers the modeling, observing, and forecasting of processes related to water and energy fluxes and storage terms, including interactions with the boundary layer and lower atmosphere, and including processes related to precipitation, radiation, and other meteorological inputs.

See also 
 List of scientific journals in earth and atmospheric sciences

External links 
 

Publications established in 2000
Bimonthly journals
English-language journals
American Meteorological Society academic journals
Meteorology journals
Hydrology journals